In mathematics, an inequation is a statement that an inequality holds between two values. It is usually written in the form of a pair of expressions denoting the values in question, with a relational sign between them indicating the specific inequality relation. Some examples of inequations are:

 
 
 
 

In some cases, the term "inequation" can be considered synonymous to the term "inequality", while in other cases, an inequation is reserved only for statements whose inequality relation is "not equal to" (≠).

Chains of inequations
A shorthand notation is used for the conjunction of several inequations involving common expressions, by chaining them together. For example, the chain

is shorthand for

In rare cases, chains without such implications about distant terms are used.

Solving inequations

Similar to equation solving, inequation solving means finding what values (numbers, functions, sets, etc.) fulfill a condition stated in the form of an inequation or a conjunction of several inequations. These expressions contain one or more unknowns, which are free variables for which values are sought that cause the condition to be fulfilled. To be precise, what is sought are often not necessarily actual values, but, more in general, expressions. A solution of the inequation is an assignment of expressions to the unknowns that satisfies the inequation(s); in other words, expressions such that, when they are substituted for the unknowns, make the inequations true propositions.
Often, an additional objective expression (i.e., an optimization equation) is given, that is to be minimized or maximized by an optimal solution.

For example, 

 

is a conjunction of inequations, partly written as chains (where  can be read as "and"); the set of its solutions is shown in blue in the picture (the red, green, and orange line corresponding to the 1st, 2nd, and 3rd conjunct, respectively). For a larger example. see Linear programming#Example.

Computer support in solving inequations is described in constraint programming; in particular, the simplex algorithm finds optimal solutions of linear inequations. The programming language Prolog III also supports solving algorithms for particular classes of inequalities (and other relations) as a basic language feature. For more, see constraint logic programming.

Combinations of meanings 
Usually because of the properties of certain functions (like square roots), some inequations are equivalent to a combination of multiple others. For example, the inequation  is logically equivalent to the following three inequations combined:

See also 

 Apartness relation — a form of inequality in constructive mathematics
 Equation
 Equals sign
 Inequality (mathematics)
 Relational operator

References

Elementary algebra
Mathematical terminology